O Barco de Valdeorras is a municipality in Ourense (province) in the Galicia region of north-west Spain. It lies towards the very north-east of Ourense province. Located in the Sil valley, lying in the Serra do Eixo, is the capital of the Valdeorras region. One of its economic foundations, besides mining and slate processing, is wine production, which qualified for the Designation of Origin Valdeorras. Remains of Roman and pre-Roman culture and several stately manor houses are the most important monuments in the town. It is also famous for its wines.

History
In some caves of the Sierra de la Lastra early human remains were found. In other places close to O Barco, Castreño petroglyphs and settlements have been discovered. The Gegurros, one of the 22 villages that were part of Asturican convent, were the ancient inhabitants of this land and the adjective derived from the current name of the region (Val-de-giorres).

Romanization was intense in a strategic area rich in minerals. Among the Médulas and Montefurado are frequent traces of gold mining activity. By passing the Via Nova (XVIII of the Antonine Itinerary) that joined Braga and Astorga, and other secondary platforms, forced the people of these areas to build bridges that are a testament of that time.

In the Middle Ages, the Lordship of Valdeorras was administered by the nobility.

References 

Municipalities in the Province of Ourense